Double eagle is a gold coin of the United States with a denomination of $20.

Double Eagle may also refer to:

 Double Eagle (balloon), a helium balloon used in an attempt to cross the Atlantic Ocean in 1977
 Double eagle (golf), a golf score
 Double Eagle (mine disposal vehicle)
 Colt Double Eagle, a pistol
 Milholland Double Eagle, an ultralight aircraft
 The Double Eagle, a novel by James Twining

See also
 Double Eagle II, a helium balloon that crossed the Atlantic Ocean in 1978
 Double Eagle II Airport, an airport in Albuquerque, New Mexico
 Double-headed eagle, a device in heraldry